Go Straight is a 1925 American silent crime drama film directed by Frank O'Connor and starring Owen Moore, Mary Carr, and Gladys Hulette. Some scenes took place in a film studio, with real stars Anita Stewart and Larry Semon appearing as themselves.

Plot
As described in a film magazine review, Gilda Hart, woman member of a gang of robbers, decides to go straight, and is called yellow by the gang. Her aunt moves to the Coast. Gilda gets a job at a bank and wins the approval of her employer by detecting some counterfeit bills. The Dove, a member of the gang who loves her, brings the gang to the Coast where they find her. They try to persuade her to assist in robbing the bank, but she refuses. On the night of the robbery, she goes to the bank, takes the money, and returns to her employer's home. While she is gone, the gang goes to the bank, find the banker and bind him and carry him away in an effort to make him tell them where the money is hidden. Gilda goes to the gang to see where her employer is. She is in the room when the Detective and his aides arrive. She is accused of being an accomplice, but is given a clean record when the banker's mother tells them that Gilda had saved the money. The banker and the young woman then decide to "go straight" to see a minister.

Cast

References

Bibliography
 Connelly, Robert B. The Silents: Silent Feature Films, 1910-36, Volume 40, Issue 2. December Press, 1998.
 Munden, Kenneth White. The American Film Institute Catalog of Motion Pictures Produced in the United States, Part 1. University of California Press, 1997.

External links
 

1925 films
1925 drama films
1920s English-language films
American silent feature films
Silent American drama films
Films directed by Frank O'Connor
American black-and-white films
Preferred Pictures films
1920s American films